Welsh Labour is the branch of the United Kingdom Labour Party in Wales and the largest party in modern Welsh politics. Welsh Labour and its forebears have won a plurality of the Welsh vote at every UK general election since 1922, every Assembly and Senedd election since 1999, and all elections to the European Parliament in the period 1979–2004 and in 2014. Welsh Labour holds 22 of the 40 Welsh seats in the UK Parliament, 30 of the 60 seats in the Welsh Senedd and 576 of the 1,264 councillors in principal local authorities including overall control of 10 of the 22 principal local authorities.

Structure
Welsh Labour is formally part of the Labour Party, not separately registered with the Electoral Commission under the terms of the Political Parties, Elections and Referendums Act. In 2016, the Labour Party Conference voted to institute the office of leader of Welsh Labour, a position currently held by Mark Drakeford. Welsh Labour has autonomy in policy formulation for the areas now devolved to the Senedd and in candidate selection for it. Party objectives are set by the Welsh Executive Committee (WEC), which plays a similar function to the Labour Party's National Executive Committee (NEC) in devolved responsibilities.

The Welsh Executive Committee contains representatives of each section of the party – government, MPs, MSs, MEPs, councillors, trade unions and Constituency Labour Parties (CLPs – the basic unit of organisation throughout the Labour Party). All Wales's 40 CLPs are registered as accounting units with the Electoral Commission.

Welsh Labour headquarters in Cardiff organises the party's election campaigns at all levels of government Community Councils, Unitary Authorities, the Senedd and Westminster, supports the CLPs and branches in membership matters and performs secretarial functions for the National Assembly Labour Party (NALP) and the party's policy-making process. It also organises the annual conference – the sovereign decision-making body of the party in Wales – provides legal and constitutional advice and arbitrate on certain disciplinary matters.

History

Origins (1890s to 1945) 
By the end of the 19th century most of Wales' adult male population were able to vote, they predominantly supported the Liberal Party partially due to the influence of the Nonconformist religious movement on Welsh society as well as the party's association with various other radical causes including improving the welfare of the working classes.

In 1893, the Independent Labour party was founded, it established branches in Wales, but did not initially gain mass appeal. In 1900, the Labour Representation Committee was founded by socialist societies and trade unions, the organisation from which the Labour Party would evolve. Keir Hardie, the first leader of the Independent Labour Party, was elected as member for Merthyr Tydfil in 1900. When the National Union of Mineworkers affiliated to the party in 1908, their four sponsored Welsh MPs became Labour MPs. Over the next few years there was a steady rise in the number of Labour councillors and MPs in Wales. Particularly after the First World War, an expanded electorate and the damage the conflict caused to the Liberals reputation contributed to a major shift in support towards Labour in industrial areas. In the 1922 general election, Labour won half the Welsh parliamentary seats.

After 1922, Labour maintained consistent electoral dominance in Wales winning between 40% and 45% their at general elections for the rest of the interwar period. In 1931, when the Labour party collapsed to just 52 seats the 16 seats it won in the southern Welsh valleys constituted its largest regional stronghold anywhere in Britain. After difficult years in the 1920s and 30s, following World War II there was keen desire in Wales like elsewhere in the UK to avoid a return to the conditions of the interwar era and the Labour victory at the 1945 general election was strongly endorsed by the Welsh electorate.

As an all Wales unit (from 1947) 
In 1947, an all Wales unit was formed within the Labour Party for the first time with the merger of South Wales Regional Council of Labour and the constituency parties of north and mid Wales. This change was based on the Labour Party's support for central planning in the Welsh economy and was not at that stage any kind of endorsement of the idea of devolution.

Labour expanded its dominance of Welsh politics in the early 1950s, extending its influence in rural and Welsh speaking areas beyond its traditional industrial heartlands. Though Labour went into opposition after 1951, Welsh Labour polled over 50 per cent of the popular vote at each general election, winning seemingly impregnable majorities in the valleys of south Wales. Aneurin Bevan, for example, was routinely returned for Ebbw Vale with 80 per cent of the vote. The pattern was similar in some 15 other seats in the region. Through its actions in local government and proposals for central government Welsh Labour was perceived to be a modernising party committed to investing in infrastructure and serious about providing jobs and improving public services.

In the 1964 general election Welsh Labour polled some 58 per cent of the Welsh vote and won 28 seats. The Wilson government gave Welsh Labour the chance to enact its promise (following the Conservative government's appointment of a Minister of Welsh Affairs in the mid-1950s) to create the post of Secretary of State for Wales and a Welsh Office.  At the 1966 General Election Labour's support in Wales reached a peak, winning 61% of the vote and all but four of Wales's 36 parliamentary constituencies.

Increased competition (from 1967) 
Within three months, however, Gwynfor Evans sensationally captured Carmarthen for Plaid Cymru at a by-election and his party came close to victory at the 1967 Rhondda West and 1968 Caerphilly by-elections, achieving swings against Labour of 30 and 40 per cent respectively.

The emergence of Plaid Cymru (and the Scottish National Party) prompted the Wilson government to establish the Kilbrandon Commission, causing Welsh Labour to consider once more the case for devolution – this time in its favour. Labour victory in the February 1974 General Election pushed devolution onto the political agenda, culminating in a decisive vote against a Welsh Assembly in a 1979 referendum.

Plaid Cymru's threat in the industrial heartland fell away in the 1970s, but it and the Conservatives gained ground in Welsh-speaking and coastal Wales respectively, where Labour's roots were shallower. By the 1979 General Election, Welsh Labour held 22 of the 36 parliamentary seats, albeit with a 48 per cent share of the vote.

This relative decline was eclipsed by a dramatic fall in Labour support at the 1983 General Election. In contrast to the 1950s, the swing against Labour in Britain was matched in Wales, where voters showed themselves just as unwilling to endorse Michael Foot's markedly more left-wing manifesto. Welsh Labour polled a mere 37.5 per cent of the popular vote, yielding 20 seats. A rampant Conservative Party, by contrast, captured 14 seats (including three of the four Cardiff constituencies) and exceeded 30 per cent of the vote for the second election in succession. Welsh Labour's problems were compounded by a strong SDP–Liberal Alliance performance, gaining 23 per cent of the vote, though few seats, at what was to be the height of its success.

The miners' strike of 1984–1985 appeared to offer Welsh Labour an electoral opportunity, despite the invidious position in which it placed the new Labour leader, Neil Kinnock. At the 1987 General Election the Welsh party polled 45 per cent, winning 24 seats and winning another two from the Conservatives at by-elections in 1989 and 1991.

However, Conservative policy in Wales could be said to have helped to break the traditional compact between Welsh Labour and the Welsh electorate. The party was ineffective when faced with the psychological trauma of restructuring and de-industrialising the Welsh economy. Meanwhile, the seemingly perpetual Conservative rule, based on its electoral power outside Wales, reignited debate within Welsh Labour on devolution.

Under John Smith, Labour committed itself to devolution for Wales and Scotland, a commitment that survived his early death. By 1997, Welsh Labour captured 34 of Wales's 40 seats, wiping out the Conservatives' Welsh representation and polling 55 per cent. The stage was set for another devolution referendum, this time won by the narrowest of margins.

Devolution era (from 1999)

In 1998 the Welsh Labour leader Ron Davies, resigned. In 1999, Wales voted in its first Assembly members; Plaid Cymru achieve 28% of the vote but Labour won with 38% and governed as a minority government. In February 2000, the first assembly leader, Alun Michael resigned following a vote of no confidence on the matter of European funding for Wales, and in October that year, Welsh Labour and the Liberal Democrats formed a coalition lasting three years. In April 2001 the Welsh government announced free entry for museums and galleries (8 months after a similar announcement in England). In 2002, free bus passes were introduced in Wales, differently to England. Welsh Labour achieve 40% the Assembly election vote in 2003. In 2004, the Richard Commission suggested increasing the legislative powers of the Assembly. In 2006, the Government of Wales Act 2006 granted the Assembly new powers. The assembly formed the Welsh Assembly government, which is separate from the legislature. In 2007, Welsh Labour introduced free prescriptions in Wales.

In the 2007 elections Welsh Labour's share of the vote fell to 32.2 per cent, its second lowest since the UK general election of 1923. Its seat number fell by four to 26: 11 more than the second largest party, Plaid Cymru. On 25 May Rhodri Morgan was again nominated as First Minister. On 27 June, Morgan concluded the One Wales agreement with Plaid Cymru, which was approved by Labour rank and file on 6 July. On 1 December 2009, Carwyn Jones became the new leader of Welsh Labour.

In March 2010 Welsh Labour twice refused to cross the PCS union picket line, leading to strong criticism for not doing so from the Welsh Conservatives and the Welsh Liberal Democrats. Carwyn Jones argued that this refusal was ingrained in Labour's thinking At the 2010 UK general election which ended Labour's long period of government across the UK, Labour also lost seats and vote share in Wales mainly to the conservatives. At the end of the One Wales agreement in 2011, Labour gained seats in the Welsh assembly at the expense of their Non-Conservative opponents. At the 2015 UK general election, Labour saw a slight uptick in vote share and made a net gain of one seat in Wales.

On 6 May 2016, Welsh Labour won 29 of the 60 seats in the Assembly elections and secured a fifth term in government, in a minority coalition with the sole remaining Welsh Lib Dem member, Kirsty Williams. In 2017 cabinet was reshuffled with Dafydd Elis-Thomas joining it. Plaid Cymru also participated in an alliance with the party from 2016 to 2017. Welsh Labour supported remain at the 2016 EU membership referendum, though most Welsh voters in that referendum ultimately chose leave. Labour won a plurality of votes and majority of seats in Wales at the 2017 and 2019 UK general elections, with the overall trend of the party's fortunes broadly mirroring its results across Britain; gaining seats and vote share in 2017 and losing both in 2019.

In the 2021 Senedd election, Welsh Labour's share of the vote rose by about 5 per cent and the party won half the seats in the Senedd, equalling its best-ever result in 2003. A few months later the party formed an agreement with Plaid Cymru over a wide range of policy including included free-at-the-point-of-use social care, expanding services for children and restrictions on second homes. The deal was the third time the two parties had agreed to work together in the era of devolution.

Electoral performance
In recent years there has been some decline for Labour in Wales. The 2009 European Parliament election saw the party fail to come first in an election in Wales for the first time since 1918 (finishing second behind the Conservatives) and in the 2010 general election Labour had its worst general election result in Wales in its history. If the swing in Wales were repeated across the UK, the Conservatives would have won a landslide victory of over 100 seats; in some, such as Pontypridd, Welsh Labour lost over 16 per cent of its vote. In the 2011 Welsh Assembly elections, Labour regained half the seats in the National Assembly. In the 2014 European Parliament election, Labour topped the poll in Wales with a swing of 7.9 percentage points. The 2015 general election saw Labour achieve its second lowest vote share in Wales during the post-World War II era.

In the 2017 general election, the decline in parliamentary elections was reversed – Labour raised its vote share to 48.9 per cent, its highest in a general election in Wales since 1997, winning 28 of the 40 Welsh seats in Westminster. However, the 2019 general election saw the party again achieve a fairly poor result by historic standards. Contrastingly, the 2021 Senedd election saw the party match its best ever result at a devolved election and almost its best ever vote share.

House of Commons

* Includes the Speaker.

Senedd

European Parliament

Councils

Excludes the results of the delayed 2013 Isle of Anglesey County Council election

Appointments

House of Lords
There are currently 14 Labour Members in the House of Lords from Wales, excluding Baroness Morgan of Ely, who is currently on leave of absence.

Elected leaders

Elected deputy leaders

General secretaries
1947: Cliff Prothero
1965: Emrys Jones
1979: Hubert Morgan
1984: Anita Gale
1999: Jessica Morden
2005: Chris Roberts
2010: David Hagendyk
2017: Louise Magee
2022: Jo McIntyre

See also

 Clear red water

References

External links

 
Labour Party (UK)
1947 establishments in Wales
Political parties in Wales